Erich Bessel-Hagen (12 September 1898 in Charlottenburg – 29 March 1946 in Bonn) was a German mathematician and a historian of mathematics.

Erich Paul Werner Bessel-Hagen was born in 1898 in Charlottenburg, a suburb, later a district in Berlin. He studied at the University of Berlin where in 1920 he obtained a Ph.D in mathematics under the direction of Constantin Carathéodory.

His reputation was that of a gentleman as well as a conscientious intellect. This was averred in the early 1940s, when the ruling Nazis increased their persecutions of German officials who have Jewish ancestry. After Felix Hausdorff (a professor 30 years his senior) had been retired and placed under restrictions, Bessel-Hagen became the only former colleague who visited him regularly. On noticing that Hausdorff used private math researches to while away time, he started bringing him books he had borrowed from a library which no longer welcomed Jews.

References

External links 
 

Differential geometers
20th-century German mathematicians
1898 births
1946 deaths